Gerrit Karl Nieuwoudt (born 8 March 1988) is a South African cricketer who played for Boland. He is a right-handed batsman and right-arm fast-medium bowler. Nieuwoudt made his first-class debut for Boland on 16 October 2008 against Griqualand West and went on to play 6 first-class matches for the province. Rated by his friends as being talented enough to play for the Proteas, Karl decided to pursue a professional career as Chartered Accountant. He currently resides in Amsterdam, the Netherlands. He enjoys playing cricket for a club in Voorburg.

References
Karl Nieuwoudt profile at CricketArchive

1988 births
Living people
Cricketers from Cape Town
South African cricketers
Boland cricketers